Gloria Jasmine Rawlinson (1 October 1918 – 25 July 1995) was a New Zealand poet, novelist, short-story writer and editor. She was born in Ha'apai, Tonga, in 1918, the daughter of Ethel Rose (Rosalie) Jennings and Alexander John Rawlinson.

References

1918 births
1995 deaths
New Zealand women novelists
New Zealand women poets
New Zealand women short story writers
20th-century New Zealand novelists
20th-century New Zealand poets
20th-century New Zealand short story writers
20th-century New Zealand women writers
New Zealand expatriates in Tonga